Wildbrain Entertainment, Inc. (commonly known as Wildbrain, stylized as W!LDBRAIN, formerly known as Wild Brain, and later known as DHX Media Los Angeles) was an American entertainment company and animation studio that developed and produced television programming, motion pictures, commercial content, and licensed merchandise. Established in 1994, it maintained offices in Los Angeles, San Francisco, and New York City. It had been operated in some form for 23 years before its eventual shutdown and repurposing of the brand name.

Its film productions included the Annie Award-winning CGI-animated short film Hubert's Brain, while its television work included the Nick Jr. series Bubble Guppies and Yo Gabba Gabba!, and the Disney Channel series Higglytown Heroes. Wildbrain also produced earlier animated shorts and television specials of Monster High for Mattel.

They have produced national commercials for clients like Esurance, Chiclets, Target, Nike, Honda, Kraft, the Wall Street Journal, and Lamisil (featuring Digger the Dermatophyte). Their ad work has won Clio Awards, ADDY Awards, BDA Awards, and Annie Awards. A subsidiary, Kidrobot, creates limited edition toys, clothing, artwork, and books. It had stores in New York City, Los Angeles, San Francisco, and Miami.

History 
In 1994, John Hays, Phil Robinson, and Jeff Fino founded Wild Brain in the Castro District of San Francisco, California. The new company bootstrapped with contract work from local game companies such as Broderbund, LucasArts, and Living Books. In 1996, Wild Brain moved to a 17,000 square foot warehouse at the corner of 18th St. and York St. in the Mission District spearheading the growth of what came to be known in San Francisco as Multimedia Gulch. In 1999, Austin, Texas-based Interfase Capital invested almost $17 million in Wild Brain.

Over the next few years, Wild Brain's staff ballooned from a staff of about 20 to about 250. It struck deals with Yahoo! and Cartoon Network to produce animated shorts for the web. It launched wildbrain.com, creating animated web shorts such as "Groove Monkee", "Mantelope", and numerous web series including Joe Paradise, Glue, Graveyard, and Space is Dum.

After legendary studio Colossal Pictures closed down in 1999, and with the financial backing of the Interfase companies, Wild Brain expanded further, providing employment for former Colossal directors and staff. Around this period, they produced the series Higglytown Heroes and Poochini.

In 2004, Charles Rivkin, former CEO of The Jim Henson Company, joined Wild Brain as president and CEO. Rivkin oversaw the creation and development of the series Yo Gabba Gabba! for Nick Jr.

In 2007, former founder Jeff Fino left to start Nuvana, an educational web-based company with former Colossal Pictures producer, Joe Kwong. Wild Brain rebranded to Wildbrain Entertainment the same year.

In 2008, Rivkin left Wildbrain after being named U.S. ambassador to France and Monaco. Michael Polis, the marketing director of Wildbrain, then became the new CEO.

Around this time, John Hays left Wildbrain to work on indie features La Mission and Howl, which opened the 2010 Sundance Film Festival.

By 2009, the original founders of the company had all left Wildbrain. The company expanded its animation studios to Sherman Oaks in March, then closed its San Francisco office in June. It had been an independent company until DHX Media purchased Wildbrain in 2010. The same year, Phil Robinson and Amy Capen, executive producer of Wildbrain's San Francisco studio, started an independent company called Special Agent Productions. Robinson died in 2015 after a short battle with pancreatic cancer.

In 2016, DHX Media announced the formation of a new London-based multi-channel network under the WildBrain name, focusing primarily on YouTube channels aimed towards children, such as content and original series from DHX's properties, as well as other forms of educational and toy-oriented content. In September 2019, DHX Media announced that it would change its name to WildBrain outright, with the MCN unit being renamed WildBrain Spark.

Filmography

Television series
 KaBlam! (1997) (The Brothers Tiki shorts)
 O Canada (1997) (opening title and bumpers)
 Acme Hour (1997) (opening, bumpers and closing)
 Oh Yeah! Cartoons (1998) ("Fathead")
 Space is Dum (1999–2001)
 Pajama Party (2000) (opening title)
 Poochini (2000–2002)
 The Chuck Jones Show (2001) (opening title)
 Higglytown Heroes (2004–2008)
 Yo Gabba Gabba! (2007–2015)
 Team Smithereen (2009–2011)
 The Ricky Gervais Show (2010–2012)
 The Hard Times of RJ Berger (2010–2011)
 Monster High (2010–2012)
 Bubble Guppies (2011) (season 1)
 The Aquabats! Super Show! (2012–2014)
 UMIGO (2012–2014)
 Sheriff Callie's Wild West (2014) (season 1)

Films
 FernGully 2: The Magical Rescue (1998)
 Dudley Do-Right (1999) (animation)
 The Adventures of Rocky and Bullwinkle (2000) (animation)
 Cats & Dogs (2001) (Egypt animation)
 Rat Race (2001) (opening title sequence)
 Dopamine (2003) (CGI animation)
 Howl (2010) (animation)
 Happiness Is a Warm Blanket, Charlie Brown (2011) (television special)

Short films
Out in Space (1997)
Humanstein (1998)
A Dog Cartoon (1998)
El Kabong Rides Again (2000)
Hubert's Brain (2001)
Anita Bomba (2001)
Erin Esurance in "Carbon Copy" (2007)
Disrespectoids (2010)

Video games
Living Books: The Berenstain Bears Get in a Fight (1995) (animation)
Living Books: Green Eggs and Ham (1996)
NeoHunter (1996) (character design and animation)
Play-Doh Creations (1996) (animation)
Flying Saucer (1997)
Rugrats Adventure Game (1998) (additional art and animation)
Star Wars: Jar Jar's Journey Adventure Book (1999)
Where in the World Is Carmen Sandiego? Treasures of Knowledge (2001) (character design)
The Oregon Trail 5th Edition (2001) (character design)
Baten Kaitos: Eternal Wings and the Lost Ocean (2003) (2D animation)
Sideway: New York (2011) (animation)

Commercials

Animax (1998) (with Mercury Filmworks)
Cap'n Crunch (2003–2007)
Cartoon Network/Tennis Industry Association (1997)
Century Theatres (2000)
Cheetos (2001)
Chicago Transit Authority (2004)
Chiclets (2004)
Chips Ahoy! (1999)
Coca-Cola (1996, 1998, 2005)
Sprite (1998)
Dreyer's (2002)
Esurance (2004–2009)
Ford Motor Company (1999, 2001)
Green Giant (1999, 2003)
Helados (1998) (with Mercury Filmworks)
Hershey's Kisses (1998–1999, 2002)
Honda Element (2005–2008)
KFC (1998–2000)
Kraft Singles (2003)
Jolly Rancher (2001)
Kid Cuisine (2001)
Lamisil (2003–2005)
Levi's (1998)
Locomotion (1997)
Lunchables (2004–2008)
Mainstay Mutual Funds (1996) (with Little Fluffy Clouds)
Nike (1996, 1999)
NTB (1997–1998)
Noggin (1999)
Oreo O's (2002)
Parfums de Coeur (1999, 2001)
PBS Kids (2005)
Pebbles (2002–2004)
Reese's Sticks (1999)
Rice Krispies (1998)
Ritz Crackers (2000–2001)
Scandinavian Designs (2000)
Secret Central (2003)
Sony Music Entertainment (2000)
The SpongeBob SquarePants Movie (2004)
STP (1996)
Target Corporation (2001)
Tropicana (2003)
The Wall Street Journal (2002)
The Willy Wonka Candy Company (1998–2000, 2004)
Winterfresh (2001)
Virgin America (2007)
Visine (2001)
Xerox Document Centre (1997)

Staff

Executives 
 Michael Polis
 Marge Dean
 David Graber
 Bob Higgins
 Amy Capen
 Jeff Fino (1994–2007)
 Scott Hyten
 Jeff Ulin
 Charles Rivkin (2004–2008)

Directors 
 Chris Hauge
 George Evelyn
 Paul Fierlinger
 Denis Morella
 Scott Schultz
 Phil Robinson (March 1995–July 2009)
 John Hays
 Ed Bell
 Robin Steele
 Dave Marshall
 Dave Thomas
 Dave Feiss (2000–2002)
 Roque Ballesteros (2000–2001; 2006–2007)
 Denis Morella

Animators
 Dave Thomas
 Sean Dicken (August 1999–August 2001; July 2003–September 2006; May 2007–October 2009)
 Jeff Nevins
 Alex Currier
 Sam Hood
 Roque Ballesteros (1998–2000)
 Rob Lily (2009–2010)
 Nick Butera (2010–2012?)
 Lyndon Ruddy

References

External links 
  (archived)
 Animation Insider Article
 SF Weekly "The Little Animation Company That Could" by Ryan Blitstein

Companies based in San Francisco
WildBrain
Advertising directors
American animation studios
Mass media companies established in 1994
1994 establishments in California
2010 mergers and acquisitions